Buell F. Jones (November 25, 1892 – November 17, 1947) was an American attorney and 11th Attorney General of South Dakota between 1923 and 1929. Born in Spain, South Dakota, Buell graduated from the University of South Dakota School of Law. A member of the Republican Party, he was elected in 1922 as Attorney General of South Dakota. He was re-elected in 1924, 1926, and 1928.

References

1892 births
1947 deaths
20th-century American lawyers
People from Marshall County, South Dakota
South Dakota Attorneys General
South Dakota Republicans
University of South Dakota School of Law alumni